Rogeria is a genus of ant in the subfamily Myrmicinae. The genus is known from the Americas (from southwestern United States to Argentina), Pacific (Tahiti to New Guinea), and Caribbean. Little is known about their biology.

Species

Rogeria alzatei Kugler, 1994
Rogeria belti Mann, 1922
Rogeria besucheti Kugler, 1994
Rogeria blanda (Smith, 1858)
Rogeria bruchi Santschi, 1922
Rogeria brunnea Santschi, 1930
Rogeria carinata Kugler, 1994
Rogeria ciliosa Kugler, 1994
Rogeria cornuta Kugler, 1994
Rogeria creightoni Snelling, 1973
Rogeria cuneola Kugler, 1994
Rogeria curvipubens Emery, 1894
Rogeria exsulans Wilson & Taylor, 1967
Rogeria foreli Emery, 1894
Rogeria germaini Emery, 1894
Rogeria gibba Kugler, 1994
Rogeria inermis Mann, 1922
Rogeria innotabilis Kugler, 1994
Rogeria lacertosa Kempf, 1963
Rogeria leptonana Kugler, 1994
Rogeria lirata Kugler, 1994
Rogeria megastigmatica Kugler, 1994
Rogeria merenbergiana Kugler, 1994
Rogeria micromma Kempf, 1961
Rogeria minima Kusnezov, 1958
Rogeria neilyensis Kugler, 1994
Rogeria nevadensis Kugler, 1994
Rogeria pellecta Kempf, 1963
Rogeria procera Emery, 1896
Rogeria prominula Kugler, 1994
Rogeria scandens (Mann, 1922)
Rogeria scobinata Kugler, 1994
Rogeria sicaria Kempf, 1962
Rogeria stigmatica Emery, 1897
Rogeria subarmata (Kempf, 1961)
Rogeria terescandens Kugler, 1994
Rogeria tonduzi Forel, 1899
Rogeria tribrocca Kugler, 1994
Rogeria tsumani LaPolla & Sosa-Calvo, 2006
Rogeria unguispina Kugler, 1994

References

External links

Myrmicinae
Ant genera